The 1989 Christchurch mayoral election was part of the New Zealand local elections held that same year. In 1989, election were held for the Mayor of Christchurch plus other local government positions. The polling was conducted using the standard first-past-the-post electoral method.

Background
Sitting Mayor Hamish Hay retired and was succeeded by Labour Party councillor Vicki Buck who became Christchurch's first female mayor.

There was deadlock on the city council with a four-way split in its membership. The Labour Party won a plurality of seats with eight seats, the United Citizens won seven, the new Christchurch Action ticket with six seats and the remaining three seats won by independent candidates. Prior to the election there was a schism on the right wing Citizens' Association resulting in two conservative tickets running against each other. Christchurch Action was set up, comprising former councillors from districts that merged with the city as part of the 1989 local government reforms.

Results
The following table gives the election results:

Ward results
Candidates were also elected from wards to the Christchurch City Council.

References

Mayoral elections in Christchurch
1989 elections in New Zealand
Politics of Christchurch
October 1989 events in New Zealand
1980s in Christchurch